The Washington Avenue Commercial Historic District is a nationally recognized historic district located in Iowa Falls, Iowa, United States. It was listed on the National Register of Historic Places in 2012.  At the time of its nomination the district consisted of 59 resources, including 42 contributing buildings and 15 non-contributing buildings.  The district takes in most of the city's central business district.  The buildings here were generally used for retail and office purposes.  An opera house and theater are also located here.  Around the edges of the district are buildings that housed automobile dealerships.    The buildings generally range from one to two stories, but a couple structures are three stories in height.  Built between the 1857 and 1960, the buildings are composed of masonry construction.  The commercial Italianate and Classical Revival styles are dominant.

Seven buildings that were individually listed on the National Register of Historic Places are contributing properties in the district.  They include: the W.R.C. Hall (1898), the Metropolitan Opera House (1899), the Ellsworth-Jones Building (1902), the Sentinel Block (1905), the McClanahan Block (1913), First National Bank (1918), and the Princess Sweet Shop (1935).

References

Iowa Falls, Iowa
Italianate architecture in Iowa
Neoclassical architecture in Iowa
National Register of Historic Places in Hardin County, Iowa
Historic districts in Hardin County, Iowa
Historic districts on the National Register of Historic Places in Iowa